Vigilantes of Boomtown is a 1947 American Western film in the Red Ryder film series directed by R. G. Springsteen, written by Earle Snell, and starring Allan Lane, Robert Blake, Martha Wentworth, Roscoe Karns, Roy Barcroft and Peggy Stewart. It was released on February 15, 1947, by Republic Pictures.

Plot

Cast  
Allan Lane as Red Ryder
Robert Blake as Little Beaver 
Martha Wentworth as Duchess Wentworth
Roscoe Karns as Billy Delaney
Roy Barcroft as McKean
Peggy Stewart as Molly McVey
George Tume as Jim Corbett
Eddie Lou Simms as Eddie
George Chesebro as Dink
Bobby Barber as Corbett's Second
George Lloyd as Thug Hired by Molly
Ted Adams as Sheriff
John Dehner as Bob Fitzsimmons
Earle Hodgins as Governor

References

External links 
 

1947 films
American Western (genre) films
1947 Western (genre) films
Republic Pictures films
Films directed by R. G. Springsteen
Films based on comic strips
Films based on American comics
American black-and-white films
1940s English-language films
1940s American films
Red Ryder films